Antônio Augusto Borges de Medeiros (19 November 1863 – 25 April 1961) was a Brazilian lawyer and politician, and the President of Rio Grande do Sul for a total of 25 years (1898–1908 and 1913–1928), during the period of Brazilian history known as the República Velha.

Medeiros was born in Caçapava do Sul.  He ran in the presidential election of 1934, but was defeated by President Getúlio Vargas.  He died in Porto Alegre, aged 97.

1863 births
1961 deaths
19th-century Brazilian lawyers
Republican Party of Rio Grande do Sul politicians
Members of the Chamber of Deputies (Brazil) from Rio Grande do Sul
Candidates for President of Brazil